The Cambrian–Ordovician extinction event occurred approximately 488 million years ago (mya). This early Phanerozoic Eon extinction event eliminated many brachiopods and conodonts, and severely reduced the number of trilobite species. The Period in the Cambrian extinction in which most of the extinction occurred was the Caerfai Period. 

It was preceded by the less-documented (but probably more extensive) End-Botomian extinction event around 517 million years ago and the Dresbachian extinction event about 502 million years ago.

The Cambrian–Ordovician event ended the Cambrian Period, and led into the Ordovician Period in the Paleozoic Era.

Theories

 Glaciation
 Depletion of oxygen in marine waters
 Flood basalt event (Kalkarindji large igneous province, Australia)

Controversy

Soft-body fossils with morphology characteristic of the Cambrian have been uncovered in Morocco, dated 20 million years post-extinction. The 2010 paper by Roy, Orr, Botting, and their collaborators that announced the discovery suggests that Cambrian species persisted into the mid-Paleozoic. They argue that what had been interpreted as a Cambrian-Ordovician extinction is instead an artifact resulting from a gap in the stratigraphic record. Remains of soft-bodied animals prevalent in earlier, exceptional Cambrian fossil beds were only preserved in later, Ordovician deposits in rare places where special conditions promoted fossilization of soft bodies.

See also
End-Botomian extinction event, circa 517 mya
Dresbachian extinction event, circa 502 mya
Geologic time scale
Furongian, Late or Upper Cambrian period
Early Ordovician period

References

Further reading
 Gradstein, Felix, James Ogg, and Alan Smith, eds., 2004. A Geologic Time Scale 2004 (Cambridge University Press)
 Hallam, Anthony and Paul B. Wignall, 1997. Mass extinctions and their aftermath (Oxford University Press)
 Webby, Barry D. and Mary L. Droser, eds., 2004. The Great Ordovician Biodiversification Event (Columbia University Press)

External links
 Early Ordovician Climate
 Speculated Causes For the Cambrian Extinction

Extinction events
History of climate variability and change
Furongian extinctions
Early Ordovician extinctions